Sevenoaks Shopping Centre is a shopping mall complex in Abbotsford, British Columbia, Canada. Sevenoaks has over 100 retail stores, services and food establishments.

Sevenoaks is located approximately one hour east of Vancouver, and minutes from two U.S. border crossings. Sevenoaks Shopping Centre was built in 1975; expansions occurred in 1984, 1989, 1991 and 1999-2000. During the 1991 expansion, a Water Clock was purchased and added to the mall, this was moved to the Abbotsford International Airport in 2000 due to maintenance issues. It is managed by Morguard.

Anchor tenants
Hudson's Bay 
Sport Chek	
Best Buy 
Royal Bank of Canada

Former Anchors
Kmart (closed 1998)
Sears  (closed September 2017) to be replaced by Ardene
Parisotto's Your Independent Grocer  (Closed September 2018)

See also
Abbotsford, British Columbia
List of shopping malls in Canada

References

External links
Sevenoaks Shopping Centre Official Site

Buildings and structures in Abbotsford, British Columbia
Shopping malls established in 1975